The Chaussée de Charleroi or Charleroisesteenweg (Dutch) is a major street in Brussels, Belgium, running through the municipalities of Saint-Gilles and the City of Brussels. It connects the / in the City of Brussels to the Ma Campagne crossroad in Saint-Gilles. It forms the N261 road with the /, the / and the /. It is named after the city of Charleroi (Wallonia).

Many bars, restaurants, hotels and shops are located on the Chaussée de Charleroi. The Brussels tram routes 92 and 97 also run on this street.

See also

 List of streets in Brussels

Charleroi
City of Brussels
Saint-Gilles, Belgium